Love & Other Bruises is the third studio album by British-Australian soft rock duo Air Supply. It was their debut album in America and only released internationally.  The album compiled re-recorded versions of some of their past singles, such as "What a Life", "Feel the Breeze" and "Empty Pages", from their self-titled debut album, and "Do It Again", "End of the Line" and "That's How the Whole Thing Started" from the album The Whole Thing's Started. "Who Will Love Me Now" and Does It Matter" were new songs written for this specific album.

The album was recorded in America while the band were touring in support of Rod Stewart and designed specifically for the American market. Air Supply's touring band was not utilized on the record. Lead vocalists Graham Russell and Russell Hitchcock sang their parts to tracks laid down by American studio musicians. Jeremy Paul, Air Supply's bass player and third lead vocalist was relegated to backing vocal duties for the recording sessions. This led to his leaving the band after the album's release.

The album failed to chart.

Reception
Cash Box magazine said "Their music is polished, poised and mainstream without being predictable."

Track listing 
All songs composed by Graham Russell.
 "Love and Other Bruises"
 "What a Life"
 "Feel the Breeze"
 "Who Will Love Me Now"
 "Do It Again"
 "The End of the Line"
 "Ready for You"
 "Empty Pages"
 "Does It Matter"
 "That's How the Whole Thing Started"

Personnel 
Russell Hitchcock, Graham Russell - lead vocals
Russell Hitchcock, Graham Russell, Jeremy Paul, Joey Carbone - backing vocals
Ross Salomone - drums, percussion
Jeff Eyrich - bass guitar
Rick Lo Tempio, Tony Berg - electric guitar
Tony Berg - acoustic guitar
Joey Carbone - acoustic piano, clavinet, electric piano
John Jarvis - acoustic piano
Jimmy Horowitz - organ and piano on "That's How The Whole Thing Started"
Steve Madaio, Chuck Findley, Jim Horn, David Luell - horns
Jim Horn - alto saxophone solo on "Does It Matter"
David Luell - tenor saxophone solo on "What A Life": David Luell
Strings arranged by David Katz
Technical
Management: Bastall Reynolds
Engineer: Tim Sadler
Producer: Jimmy Horowitz
Design: Roger Carpenter, Nancy Donald
Photography: Gary Heery

References

1978 albums
Air Supply albums
Columbia Records albums